Vadim Yevgenyevich Afanasev (born 13 September 2000) is a Russian trampoline gymnast. He won the gold medal in the men's tumbling competition at the 2018 Trampoline Gymnastics World Championships held in Saint Petersburg, Russia. He also won the gold medal in the men's tumbling and men's team tumbling events at the 2021 European Trampoline Championships held in Sochi, Russia.

In 2019, he helped Russia win the gold medal in the all-around team event at the 2019 Trampoline World Championships held in Tokyo, Japan.

References

External links 
 

Living people
2000 births
Place of birth missing (living people)
Russian male trampolinists
Medalists at the Trampoline Gymnastics World Championships
21st-century Russian people